The 2017 Spanish Grand Prix (formally known as the Formula 1 Gran Premio de España Pirelli 2017) was a Formula One motor race held on 14 May 2017 at the Circuit de Barcelona-Catalunya in Montmeló, Spain.

Report

Free practice
Both of Friday's practice sessions finished with an identical top six on the timesheet, with Lewis Hamilton heading the list, his Mercedes teammate Valtteri Bottas second and the Ferraris of Kimi Räikkönen and Sebastian Vettel third and fourth respectively. Next came the Red Bulls, with Max Verstappen fifth in both sessions and Daniel Ricciardo sixth. McLaren Honda's run of poor reliability continued, with home favourite Fernando Alonso sitting out most of the first session after his car suffered a major engine failure during his first lap. Alonso was able to take part in the second session, but had to wait until almost half an hour into it while his team was completing an engine change.

The third practice session, on Saturday morning, finished with Räikkönen quickest, Vettel second, and Hamilton third. Bottas was fourth after his engine suffered a water leak and he was only able to run towards the end of the session, once Mercedes had changed the engine. The Red Bull pair of Verstappen and Ricciardo were again fifth and sixth.

Qualifying
Lewis Hamilton claimed pole position from Sebastian Vettel by 0.051 seconds. Vettel was initially ordered to stop the car on track for an engine problem in Q1 but he questioned the decision and the problem was resolved and allowed him to continue. Valtteri Bottas and Kimi Räikkönen filled up the second row followed by the Red Bulls of Max Verstappen and Daniel Ricciardo. Fernando Alonso delivered a shocking result to get his underpowered McLaren into Q3 and then qualifying as the best of the rest behind Mercedes, Ferrari and Red Bull. The top ten was filled out by Sergio Pérez, Felipe Massa and Esteban Ocon.

Race
Vettel had a better start than Hamilton and led into the first corner. Then an incident with Bottas, Räikkönen and Verstappen meant that both Räikkönen and Verstappen retired with suspension damage and Bottas was left slightly handicapped. The incident also caused Felipe Massa to obtain a puncture, while also forcing Alonso off the track, leading them to eventually finish the race outside of the points. This left the top ten as Vettel, Hamilton, Bottas, Ricciardo, Pérez, Ocon, Hülkenberg, Magnussen, Sainz and Grosjean. Hamilton stuck with Vettel for 14 laps, when Ferrari decided to cover off the undercut by pitting for softs. Hamilton meanwhile stayed out on track for 7 extra laps and rejoined around 7 seconds behind Vettel on the medium tyres. Vettel lost around 4 seconds to Hamilton trying to get past Bottas, who hadn't pitted yet, before completing a spectacular overtake on Bottas.

With just over 30 laps remaining, the McLaren of Vandoorne drove into Massa and retired with suspension damage, earning him a grid penalty at the next race. The Virtual Safety Car (VSC) was brought out so his car could be removed and this allowed Hamilton to pit for the faster soft tyres, while not losing much time to Vettel due to the limited speed. Vettel then pitted for the slower medium tyres as was required, just when the VSC had finished, resulting in Vettel coming out of the pitlane alongside Hamilton. They touched wheels and Hamilton was forced off the track and had to fall behind Vettel. Then on lap 38, the Mercedes of Bottas suffered an engine failure (from the engine he had used for all previous races) and this promoted Ricciardo into a podium place. Meanwhile, Pascal Wehrlein who was doing a one-stop, used the VSC to his advantage and came out of the pits in 8th; he then got promoted to 7th following Bottas's retirement. However, he received a five-second penalty for an error in entering the pit lane.

Hamilton, with faster tyres, then managed to overtake Vettel for the lead on the pit straight on lap 44 and held on to the lead to win the race, reducing Vettel's lead in the championship to 6 points and increasing Mercedes's lead in the Constructors' Championship to 8 points over Ferrari. Ricciardo finished 3rd for his first podium of the season and took the 5th place in the Championship from Verstappen. Despite new upgrades, his Red Bull was 75 seconds behind Hamilton, the furthest back they had been all season, and Ricciardo was the only other car apart from the 2 leaders to finish on the lead lap. The next to cross the line were the Force Indias of Pérez and Ocon. Then Nico Hülkenberg finished in 6th place for Renault, their highest finish since returning to the sport in 2016. Wehrlein crossed the line in 7th but was demoted to 8th with his penalty, still picking up 4 valuable points for the struggling Sauber team, with the Toro Rosso of Carlos Sainz being promoted to the 7th in his stead. Kvyat and Grosjean finished 9th and 10th respectively after Kevin Magnussen, who was running in 9th, suffered a late puncture due to contact with Kvyat and fell to 14th. Fernando Alonso finished in 12th, the first time he had finished a race in the season, but he admitted he was lacking the race pace to go with his superb qualifying.

Classification

Qualifying

  – Stoffel Vandoorne received a ten-place grid penalty for use of additional power unit elements.

Race

Notes
  – Pascal Wehrlein received a 5-second penalty for failing to keep to the right of the pit-entry bollard and moved down from 7th to 8th position.

Championship standings after the race

Drivers' Championship standings

Constructors' Championship standings

 Note: Only the top five positions are included for both sets of standings.

See also 
 2017 Barcelona Formula 2 round
 2017 Barcelona GP3 Series round

References

External links

 The race on the official Formula One website

Spain
Spanish Grand Prix
Grand Prix
Spain Grand Prix